Labrisomus multiporosus, the Porehead blenny, is a species of labrisomid blenny native to the eastern Pacific Ocean from Mexico to Peru including the Galapagos Islands. It can reach a length of  TL though most do not exceed .

References

multiporosus
Fish described in 1953
Taxa named by Clark Hubbs